Donald MacLeod (17 November 1932 – 29 May 2008) was a New Zealand cricketer. He played first-class cricket for Canterbury, Central Districts and Wellington between 1956 and 1968.

References

External links
 

1932 births
2008 deaths
New Zealand cricketers
Canterbury cricketers
Central Districts cricketers
Wellington cricketers
Cricketers from Wellington City
North Island cricketers